Đorđe "Đoko" Lavrnić (6 June 1946 – 27 November 2010) was a Yugoslav handball player who competed in the 1972 Summer Olympics.

Club career
After starting out at Slatina, Lavrnić played for Krivaja Zavidovići and Crvenka, before moving abroad to Germany. He spent three seasons with TuS Derschlag in the Handball-Bundesliga (1975–1978), finishing as the league's top scorer each year. Later on, Lavrnić would play for VfL Günzburg, before returning to Yugoslavia and joining Sloga Doboj.

International career
At international level, Lavrnić competed for Yugoslavia at the 1972 Summer Olympics, winning the gold medal. He also participated in two World Championships (1970 and 1974), bringing home a bronze medal on both occasions.

References

External links
 

1946 births
2010 deaths
Serbs of Croatia
Yugoslav male handball players
Olympic handball players of Yugoslavia
Olympic gold medalists for Yugoslavia
Handball players at the 1972 Summer Olympics
Olympic medalists in handball
Medalists at the 1972 Summer Olympics
RK Krivaja Zavidovići players
RK Crvenka players
Handball-Bundesliga players
Expatriate handball players
Yugoslav expatriate sportspeople in Germany